Lossen was a frigate built for the navy of Denmark–Norway at Isegran, Fredrikstad, Norway, and launched in 1684.

Lossen was wrecked during the Christmas storm of 1717, outside the island Vesteroyen (in norwegian Vesterøy) in Hvaler, Norway. Nearly half of the crew of 103 perished.

The wreck was found in 1963, and explored by the Norwegian Maritime Museum in 1967, 1968, and 1974.

HDMS Lossen was also the name of a cable minelayer in the Danish Navy, decommissioned in 2004.

References

Ships built in Fredrikstad
Frigates of the Royal Dano-Norwegian Navy
Shipwrecks of Norway
1680s ships
Maritime incidents in 1717